KGRM (91.5 FM) is a radio station  broadcasting a variety format. Licensed to Grambling, Louisiana, United States. The station is currently owned by Grambling State University.

References

External links

Grambling, Louisiana
Radio stations in Louisiana
College radio stations in Louisiana
Radio stations in Ruston, Louisiana